Magnolia fulva is a species of flowering plant in the family Magnoliaceae, native to south-central China and Vietnam. It was first described, as Michelia fulva, in 1987.

Two varieties are recognized:
Magnolia fulva var. calcicola (C.Y.Wu ex Y.W.Law & Y.F.Wu) ined.
Magnolia fulva var. fulva

References

fulva
Flora of South-Central China
Plants described in 1987